Field flattener lens is a type of lens used in modern binocular designs (e.g. Canon 10 x 42 L IS WP, 18 x 50 IS All Weather and Swarovski EL 8.5 x 42, EL 10 x 42) and in astronomic telescopes.

Field flattener lenses in binoculars improve edge sharpness.

Field flattener lenses counteract the Petzval field curvature of an optical system. In other words, the function of a field flattener lens is to counter the field-angle dependence of the focal length of a system.

The object in designing a field flattening lens is to create a lens that shifts the focal points of the Petzval surface to lie in the same plane. Consider inserting a pane of glass in a focusing beam. Due to refraction, the focal point of the beam is shifted by  dependent on the thickness of the glass. Thus we have a thickness as a function of focal shift: 
. 

 is given by the radius of curvature of the Petzval surface, . It can be shown, then, that the radius of curvature for the lens that would flatten out the field is given by

Examples of use
In the 21st century, the New Horizons spacecraft, which was an unmanned space probe sent past Pluto and the Kuiper belt, had a telescope instrument called  the Long Range Reconnaissance Imager. LORRI was a reflecting telescope but incorporated a field-flattening lens, with three elements.

See also 
 Petzval field curvature
 Coma corrector

References

Lenses